The 1902 international cricket season was from April 1902 to September 1902.

Season overview

May

Ireland in England

June

Australia in England

Australia in Scotland

August

MCC in Netherlands

References

International cricket competitions by season
1902 in cricket